The Greeks Have a Word For It is the second novel by Booker Prize-winning author Barry Unsworth published by Hutchinson in 1967. It has since been republished by Weidenfeld & Nicolson in 1993 and W. W. Norton & Company in 2002. It has been praised for its 'utterly convincing characterizations'.

Background
It is set in Athens in the aftermath of the Greek Civil War and draws on the author's own experiences teaching English as a foreign language, satirizing many members of the British Council in Athens.

Plot introduction
Two men arrive in Athens on the same boat. Kennedy an Englishman intends to make a living teaching English and devises a scam to make money fast. Mitsos is returning to Greece after many years away but finds it impossible to escape the memories of the brutal deaths of his parents at the hands of fellow Greeks during the war and an opportunity arises to take revenge. The two men meet briefly as they disembark the boat but their stories then diverge only to come together at the end of the book with fatal results.

References

1967 British novels
English novels
Novels by Barry Unsworth
Novels set in Greece
Works about the Greek Civil War
Hutchinson (publisher) books